The Brickell Avenue Bridge is a bascule bridge in Downtown Miami, Florida, that carries U.S. Route 1 (US 1; Brickell Avenue) over the Miami River. The original Brickell Avenue Bridge was built in 1929, and replaced in 1995. The Brickell Avenue Bridge was widened by one additional northbound lane in 2006 to reduce the traffic bottleneck through downtown. Before this there were three southbound but only two northbound lanes. Currently there are three lanes in each direction as well as a pedestrian walkway on both sides. Still, the bridge causes frequent traffic delays on the busy Brickell Avenue when it opens. According to the Florida Department of Transportation (FDOT), the bridge opened 4,990 times in 2010.

The statue is a 53-foot bronze monument commissioned by the Florida Department of Transportation and created by Cuban Master Sculptor Manuel Carbonell in 1995.  The "Pillar of History" consist of a 36-foot high carved bas-relief column that graphically narrates the lives of the Tequesta Indians, Miami's first inhabitants, and features 158 figures.  At the top stands a 17-foot bronze sculpture, "Tequesta Family" portraying a Tequesta Indian warrior aiming an arrow to the sky, looking for space in eternity, with his wife and child by his side, while the son covers his face in expectation of their extinction. top.

Carbonell also created four bas reliefs, measuring 4-feet by 8-feet, which were installed in niches on the bridge's supporting piers. Each relief honors Miami's early founders and pioneers - William and Mary Brickell, Henry Flagler, Marjory Stoneman Douglas, and Julia Tuttle.

See also

References

External links

Bascule bridges in the United States
Road bridges in Florida
U.S. Route 1
Bridges of the United States Numbered Highway System
Tequesta
Sculptures of Native Americans
Sculptures in Florida
1929 establishments in Florida
Transportation buildings and structures in Miami
Bridges completed in 1929